Troféu Imprensa (English: Press Trophy, is an award presented annually by SBT, to honor the best Brazilian television productions, including telenovelas. It is known as the "Brazilian Emmy Awards."

Awards
Best Telenovela
Best Actor of Telenovela
Best Actress of Telenovela
Best Male Singer
Best Female Singer
Best Male TV Host
Best Female TV Host
Best Talk Show 
Best Comedy TV Show 
Best Children's TV Show
Best Newscast 
Best Newscast Host
Best Documentary TV Show
Best Auditory TV Show
Best TV Commercial
Best Musical Group
Best Song
Best Country Duo
Newcomer of the Year (Best New Artist)

See also
 Latin American television awards

External links

 
Brazilian television awards
Sistema Brasileiro de Televisão
Awards established in 1961
1961 establishments in Brazil